James Spiller  (c.1761–1829) was an English architect and surveyor, a close associate of Sir John Soane.  His designs included the Church of St John-at-Hackney, and the Great Synagogue, London.

Life

Spiller was a pupil of the architect James Wyatt  and became a close friend of John Soane, who sometimes employed him as a surveyor,  and to draft papers on subjects on which they shared views such as the evils of speculative building. John Summerson described Spiller as "a clever man, with a difficult temperament, which perhaps was against his emerging into the front rank of architects."

He was responsible for two major religious buildings in London. His Great Synagogue in Duke's Place was built 1788–90. Destroyed by bombing  during the Second World War, it had tall Ionic colonnades and a flat ceiling. His new parish church of St John-at-Hackney – a bulky brick building – was constructed in 1792–7. In 1812–13 he added  porches and, in stark contrast to the rest of the structure, a Portland Stone steeple with flowing curvelinear elements. In 1817 he  remodelled the interior of James Wyatt's chapel of ease (later the Church of Saint John the Baptist) in Highgate Road, Kentish Town,  and in 1820 he added a portico with square piers to Benjamin Dean Wyatt's Theatre Royal, Drury Lane.

He was surveyor to the British Fire Office (from 1799),<ref>{{cite news|title=King's Theatre.|newspaper= The Times (London)| date=17 April 1799|page= 1 |accessdate=4 October 2014|url=http://find.galegroup.com/ttda/infomark.do?&source=gale&prodId=TTDA&userGroupName=palmers&tabID=T003&docPage=article&searchType=BasicSearchForm&docId=CS16915601&type=multipage&contentSet=LTO&version=1.0}} </ref> the Royal Exchange Insurance, and the Eagle Insurance Corporation.

He died in at his home in Guildford Street, London on 3 May 1829 

His brother John (1763–94) was a sculptor who made a statue of Charles II for the Royal Exchange.

WritingsAddress to the Governors & Guardians of the Foundling-Hospital, by Jas. Spiller and Thos. Spencer, ... intended as a justification of their reports and proceedings, in reply to observations upon their said reports and proceedings, by Samuel Pepys Cockerell, Esq.  (1807); republished with an additional letter as Reports upon the buildings erected on the estate of the Foundling Hospital (1808).Letter to John Soane on the subject of the new churches (1822).  Spiller also conducted a  lengthy private correspondence with Soane, in which he criticised  the Church Commissioners' enthusiasm for competitions and their emphasis on economy. Soane financed the printing of 500 copies of the first Letter. It was superseded by a Second Letter to John Soane'' (1823); more than 100 loose copies  of the first one remain in the Soane archive.

References

Sources

1760s births
1829 deaths
Architects from London